Robert "Bob" Earl Maddox (born May 2, 1949) is a former professional American football defensive lineman in the National Football League (NFL). He played college football at Frostburg State College, where he played defensive tackle and defensive end. He then was drafted in the 7th round by the Cincinnati Bengals in the 1973 NFL Draft. He went on to play for the Kansas City Chiefs for two years afterwards. He was also illegally drafted by the San Francisco 49ers in the 15th round of the 1972 NFL Draft.

References

1949 births
Living people
Sportspeople from Frederick, Maryland
Players of American football from Maryland
American football defensive tackles
American football defensive ends
Frostburg State Bobcats football players
Cincinnati Bengals players
Kansas City Chiefs players